Air Vice-Marshal Philip Jeremy Robinson,  is a decorated British pilot and senior Royal Air Force officer.

RAF career
Having flown Chinooks, he has been awarded the Distinguished Flying Cross (DFC) three times for service during the War in Afghanistan and the Iraq War. He flew in operations in Bosnia, Albania, Northern Ireland, Kosovo, Sierra Leone, Iraq, Lebanon and Afghanistan. From October 2015 to October 2017, he was the Commanding Officer of RAF Odiham and the Joint Special Forces Aviation Wing. 

He is a graduate of the United States' Capstone Military Leadership Program, and the United Kingdom's Advanced Command and Staff Course and the Higher Command and Staff Course.

Robinson served as Assistant Chief of Staff at the Permanent Joint Headquarters from April 2019, before being appointed Director Combined Air and Space Operations Centre at Al Udeid Air Base, Qatar, in December 2020. In December 2021, he was promoted to air vice-marshal and took up the appointment of air officer commanding (AOC) No. 11 Group RAF.

Honours
On 29 October 2002, Robinson was awarded the Distinguished Flying Cross (DFC) "in recognition of gallant and distinguished services in Afghanistan during the period 1st October 2001 to 31st March 2002". On 31 October 2003, he was awarded a Bar to his DFC "for gallant and distinguished services in Iraq during the period 19th March to 19th April 2003". On 25 July 2008, he was awarded a second Bar to his DFC "in recognition of gallant and distinguished services in Afghanistan during the period 1st October 2007 to 31st March 2008". He was appointed an Officer of the Order of the British Empire in the 2013 Birthday Honours, and advanced to Commander of the Order of the British Empire in the 2021 New Year Honours.

References

 

 
 
 

Living people
Date of birth missing (living people)
Year of birth missing (living people)
British aviators
Royal Air Force officers
Royal Air Force air marshals
Commanders of the Order of the British Empire
Recipients of the Distinguished Flying Cross (United Kingdom)
Royal Air Force personnel of the Iraq War
British military personnel of the Sierra Leone Civil War
Royal Air Force personnel of the War in Afghanistan (2001–2021)
20th-century Royal Air Force personnel
21st-century Royal Air Force personnel